Minnesota March is a march for wind band written by John Philip Sousa for the University of Minnesota.  The piece was one of four marches written by Sousa expressly for a university.  It is now used as one of the university's school songs, with lyrics written in 1927 by university band director Michael Jalma.  The piece is regularly performed by the University of Minnesota Marching Band and pep bands and often sung by students at various athletic events and ceremonies.

Lyrics

See also 
 List of marches by John Philip Sousa

References

External links
Minnesota March as performed by the University of Minnesota Marching Band

Sousa marches
1927 compositions
Concert band pieces